The 1993 Tour de France was the 80th edition of Tour de France, one of cycling's Grand Tours. The Tour began in Le Puy du Fou with a prologue individual time trial on 3 July and Stage 11 occurred on 15 July with a mountainous stage from Serre Chevalier. The race finished on the Champs-Élysées in Paris on 25 July.

Stage 11
15 July 1993 — Serre Chevalier to Isola 2000,

Stage 12
16 July 1993 — Isola to Marseille,

Stage 13
17 July 1993 — Marseille to Montpellier,

Stage 14
18 July 1993 — Montpellier to Perpignan,

Stage 15
19 July 1993 — Perpignan to Pal,

Stage 16
21 July 1993 — Andorra to Saint-Lary-Soulan Pla d'Adet,

Stage 17
22 July 1993 — Tarbes to Pau,

Stage 18
23 July 1993 — Orthez to Bordeaux,

Stage 19
24 July 1993 — Brétigny-sur-Orge to Montlhéry,  (ITT)

Stage 20
25 July 1993 — Viry-Châtillon to Paris Champs-Élysées,

References

1993 Tour de France
Tour de France stages